Leila Ryzvanauna Ismailova (born 28 July 1991) is a Belarusian journalist, TV presenter, and model of Azerbaijani ancestry. In particular, she was the host of the Junior Eurovision Song Contest 2010, which was held in Minsk (together with Dzianis Kurian). Leila was the spokesman of the Belarusian voting in the Eurovision Song Contest 2011, and hosted the national selection in Belarus for Eurovision 2012.

In 2006 Leila graduated from the Lyceum of the Belarusian State University (history form), then she graduated from the Institute of Journalism of the Belarusian State University (audiovisual journalism, diploma with honour, the best alumna 2011).

References

External links

 
 Грамчакова, В. Лейла Ісмаілава: «Мая намінацыя!» // Універсітэт. 2009. № 15 — 16. 

Living people
1989 births
Aristotle University of Thessaloniki alumni
Belarusian people of Azerbaijani descent
Belarusian State University alumni
Belarusian television presenters
Journalists from Minsk
Belarusian women television presenters